Lepturini is a tribe of flower longhorns in the family Cerambycidae.

Genera

The following are included in BioLib.cz:

 Acanthoptura Fairmaire, 1894
 Acmaeopidonia Tippmann, 1955
 Acmaeopsoides Linsley & Chemsak, 1976
 Alosterna Mulsant, 1863
 Analeptura Linsley & Chemsak, 1976
 Anastrangalia Casey, 1924
 Anoplodera Mulsant, 1839
 Asilaris Pascoe, 1866
 Bellamira LeConte, 1873
 Brachyleptura Casey, 1913
 Carlandrea Sama & Rapuzzi, 1999
 Cerrostrangalia Hovore & Chemsak, 2005
 Charisalia Casey, 1913
 Chontalia Bates, 1872
 Choriolaus Bates, 1885
 Corennys Bates, 1884
 Cornumutila Letzner, 1844
 Cortodera Mulsant, 1863
 Cribroleptura Vives, 2000
 Cyphonotida Casey, 1913
 Dokhtouroffia Ganglbauer, 1886
 Dorcasina Casey, 1913
 Elacomia Heller, 1916
 Emeileptura Holzschuh, 1991
 Ephies Pascoe, 1866
 Etorofus Matsushita, 1933
 Eurylemma Chemsak & Linsley, 1974
 Euryptera Lepeletier & Audinet-Serville in Latreille, 1828
 Eustrangalis Bates, 1884
 Formosopyrrhona Hayashi, 1957
 Fortuneleptura Villiers, 1979
 Gahanaspia Ohbayashi, 2014
 Gerdianus Holzschuh, 2011
 Gnathostrangalia Hayashi & Villiers, 1985
 Gramera Holzschuh, 2017
 Grammoptera Dejean, 1835
 Hayashiella Vives & N. Ohbayashi, 2001
 Houzhenzia Ohbayashi & Lin, 2012
 Idiopidonia Swaine & Hopping, 1928
 Idiostrangalia Nakane & Ohbayashi, 1957
 Ischnostrangalis Ganglbauer, 1889
 Japanostrangalia Nakane & Ohbayashi, 1957
 Judolia Mulsant, 1863
 Judolidia Plavilstshikov, 1936
 Kanekoa Matsushita & Tamanuki, 1942
 Katarinia Holzschuh, 1991
 Kirgizobia Danilevsky, 1992
 Konoa Matsushita, 1933
 Laoleptura Ohbayashi, 2008
 Leptochoriolaus Chemsak & Linsley, 1976
 Leptostrangalia Nakane & K. Ohbayashi, 1959
 Leptura Linnaeus, 1758
 Lepturalia Reitter, 1913
 Lepturobosca Reitter, 1913
 Lepturopsis Linsley & Chemsak, 1976
 Lycidocerus Chemsak & Linsley, 1976
 Lycochoriolaus Linsley & Chemsak, 1976
 Lycomorphoides Linsley, 1970
 Lygistopteroides Linsley & Chemsak, 1971
 Macrochoriolaus Linsley, 1970
 Macroleptura Nakane & Ohbayashi, 1957
 Megachoriolaus Linsley, 1970
 Meloemorpha Chemsak & Linsley, 1976
 Metalloleptura Gressitt & Rondon, 1970
 Metastrangalis Hayashi, 1960
 Mimiptera Linsley, 1961
 Mimocalemia N. Ohbayashi, 2019
 Mimostrangalia Nakane & Ohbayashi, 1957
 Mordellistenomimus Chemsak & Linsley, 1976
 Munamizoa Matsushita & Tamanuki, 1940
 Nagaileptura N. Ohbayashi, 2019
 Nanostrangalia Hayashi, 1974
 Nemognathomimus Chemsak & Linsley, 1976
 Neobellamira Swaine & Hopping, 1928
 Neoleptura Thomson, 1860
 Neopiciella Sama, 1988
 Nivellia Mulsant, 1863
 Nivelliomorpha Boppe, 1921
 Nustera Villiers, 1974
 Ocalemia Pascoe, 1858
 Oedecnema Dejean, 1835
 Ohbayashia Hayashi, 1958
 Orthochoriolaus Linsley & Chemsak, 1976
 Ortholeptura Casey, 1913
 Paracorymbia Miroshnikov, 1998
 Paranaspia Matsushita & Tamanuki, 1940
 Paraocalemia Vives, 2001
 Parastrangalis Ganglbauer, 1889
 Pedostrangalia Sokolov, 1897
 Platerosida Linsley, 1970
 Pseudalosterna Plavilstshikov, 1934
 Pseudoparanaspia Hayashi, 1977
 Pseudophistomis Linsley & Chemsak, 1971
 Pseudostrangalia Swaine & Hopping, 1928
 Pseudotypocerus Linsley & Chemsak, 1971
 Pseudovadonia Lobanov, Danilevsky & Murzin, 1981
 Pygoleptura Linsley & Chemsak, 1976
 Pygostrangalia Pic, 1957
 Pyrocalymma Thomson, 1864
 Pyrocorennys Ohbayashi & Niisato, 2009
 Pyrrhona Bates, 1884
 Rapuzziana Danilevsky, 2006 inq.
 Saligranta Chou & Ohbayashi, 2011
 Shimomuraia Hayashi & Villiers, 1989
 Sinostrangalis Hayashi, 1960
 Solaia Sama, 2003
 Stenelytrana Gistel, 1848
 Stenoleptura Gressitt, 1935
 Stenostrophia Casey, 1913
 Stenurella Villiers, 1974
 Stictoleptura Casey, 1924
 Strangalepta Casey, 1913
 Strangalia Audinet-Serville, 1835
 Strangalidium Giesbert, 1997
 Strangalomorpha Solsky, 1873
 Strophiona Casey, 1913
 Teratoleptura Ohbayashi, 2008
 Thrangalia Holzschuh, 1995
 Toxoleptura Miroshnikov, 1998
 Trachysida Casey, 1913
 Trigonarthris Haldeman, 1847
 Turnaia Holzschuh, 1993
 Typocerus LeConte, 1850
 Vadonia Mulsant, 1863
 Xestoleptura Casey, 1913

References

 McNamara, J. / Bousquet, Y., ed. (1991). "Family Cerambycidae (Longhorn beetles)". Checklist of beetles of Canada and Alaska, 277–300.
 Monné, Miguel A., and Edmund F. Giesbert (1995). Checklist of the Cerambycidae and Disteniidae (Coleoptera) of the Western Hemisphere, 2nd ed., xiv + 420.

Further reading

 Arnett, R. H. Jr., M. C. Thomas, P. E. Skelley and J. H. Frank. (eds.). (21 June 2002). American Beetles, Volume II: Polyphaga: Scarabaeoidea through Curculionoidea. CRC Press LLC, Boca Raton, Florida .
 
 Richard E. White. (1983). Peterson Field Guides: Beetles. Houghton Mifflin Company.

External links

 NCBI Taxonomy Browser, Lepturini

Lepturinae
Polyphaga tribes